Emma Polusny (born March 16, 1999) is an American ice hockey goaltender, currently playing in the Swedish Women's Hockey League (SDHL) with Leksands IF Dam. As a member of the United States national team, she won a gold medal at the 2019 IIHF Women's World Championship. 

Her college ice hockey career was played with the St. Cloud State Huskies women's ice hockey program in the Western Collegiate Hockey Association (WCHA) conference of the NCAA Division I during 2017 to 2022.

References

External links

1999 births
Living people
American expatriate ice hockey players in Sweden
American women's ice hockey goaltenders
Ice hockey players from Minnesota
Leksands IF Dam players
People from Hennepin County, Minnesota
St. Cloud State Huskies women's ice hockey players